The Kobben class (also known as Type 207) is a customized version of the German Type 205 submarine. Fifteen vessels of this class were built for use by the Royal Norwegian Navy in the 1960s. The class later saw service with Denmark and Poland. The boats have since been withdrawn from service in the Norwegian and Danish navies. The Polish Navy operateed two Kobben-class submarines (Bielik, Sęp) until 2021.

History 
Along with the rest of the Royal Norwegian Navy, the submarine fleet was to be modernized according to the Fleet plan of 1960. After the war, Norway needed a navy more suited for coastal operations rather than large, seagoing vessels. This made the choice of a new type of submarines rather slim, not many NATO submarines being suited for this type of operations. A German Type 201 submarine was lent to the Royal Norwegian Navy for evaluation and adaptation. The result was the Type 207, of which 15 vessels were delivered to Norway in the period 1964 – 67. All Kobben-class submarines were built by Rheinstahl Nordseewerke GmbH in Emden.

Military documents released in 2009 confirm this episode.

During that period, four others were sold to the Royal Danish Navy (known there as the Tumleren class), three operational (modernized) and one for spare parts.  served in the 2003 invasion of Iraq from May 2002 until June 2003.

In 2001, the Kobben class was completely phased out in Norwegian service, replaced by the newer . Five modernized vessels were given to the Polish Navy, four as operational units and one for spare parts. Before they were transferred, the Polish crews were trained and the boats were overhauled.

During 2004, all of the operational Danish boats (Tumleren, Sælen and Springeren) were decommissioned. They were mothballed , waiting to be scrapped or transferred to another nation.

Vessels

Notes

References 

  Marinemuseet, the Norwegian naval museum

External links 
 Nordseewerke - manufacturer's website
 Polish Navy - with Polish commission dates, pictures and information
 Danish Naval History - information about Danish use (1989–2004)

Submarine classes
 
Type 205 submarines